Henri Raphaël Moncassin (3 April 1883 – 3 September 1958) was a French sculptor. His work was part of the art competitions at the 1924 Summer Olympics and the 1932 Summer Olympics.

References

1883 births
1958 deaths
19th-century French sculptors
20th-century French sculptors
French male sculptors
Olympic competitors in art competitions
Sculptors from Toulouse
19th-century French male artists